Khalilabad (also Romanized as Khalīlābād) is a village in Pishkuh Rural District, in the Central District of Taft County, Yazd Province, Iran. At the 2006 census, its population was 163, in 44 families.

References 

Populated places in Taft County